Soltanabad may refer to:

Azerbaijan
Soltanabad, Saatly, Azerbaijan

Iran

Alborz Province
Soltanabad, Alborz, Iran
Soltanabad-e Aran, Alborz Province, Iran

Ardabil Province
Soltanabad, Ardabil, Iran

Chaharmahal and Bakhtiari Province
Soltanabad, Chaharmahal and Bakhtiari, a village in Borujen County

East Azerbaijan Province
Soltanabad, Ahar, a village in Ahar County
Soltanabad, Charuymaq, a village in Charuymaq County
Soltanabad-e Agh Ziarat, a village in Charuymaq County
Soltanabad, Sarab, a village in Sarab County

Fars Province
Soltanabad, Bavanat, a village in Bavanat County
Soltanabad, Darab, a village in Darab County
Soltanabad, Kazerun, a village in Kazerun County
Soltanabad, Kharameh, a village in Kharameh County
Soltanabad, Shiraz, a village in Shiraz County

Golestan Province
Soltanabad, Golestan, a village in Gorgan County

Hamadan Province
Soltanabad, Malayer, a village in Malayer County
Soltanabad, Hamadan, a village in Razan County

Ilam Province
Soltanabad, Ilam, a village in Ilam County

Kerman Province
Soltanabad, Anbarabad, a village in Anbarabad County
Soltanabad, Arzuiyeh, a village in Baft County
Soltanabad, Fahraj, a village in Fahraj County
Soltanabad, Zangiabad, a village in Kerman County
Soltanabad, Qaleh Ganj, a village in Qaleh Ganj County
Soltanabad, Rigan, a village in Rigan County

Kermanshah Province
Soltanabad, Kangavar, a village in Kangavar County
Soltanabad, Sahneh, a village in Sahneh County

Khuzestan Province
Soltanabad, Andika, a village in Andika County
Soltanabad, Lali, a village in Lali County
Soltanabad, Ramhormoz, a village in Ramhormoz County
Soltanabad Rural District (Khuzestan Province), in Ramhormoz County

Kohgiluyeh and Boyer-Ahmad Province
Soltanabad, Kohgiluyeh and Boyer-Ahmad, a village in Basht County

Kurdistan Province
Soltanabad, Kurdistan, a village in Qorveh County
Soltanabad, Korani, a village in Bijar County
Soltanabad, Najafabad, a village in Bijar County
Soltanabad, Taghamin, a village in Bijar County
Soltanabad-e Darreh Viran, a village in Bijar County

Lorestan Province

Markazi Province
Soltanabad, former name of Arak, Iran
Soltanabad, Markazi, a village in Zarandieh County

Mazandaran Province
Soltanabad, Mazandaran, a village in Amol County

Qazvin Province
Soltanabad, Qazvin, Iran
Soltanabad, former name of Eqbaliyeh, Iran

Razavi Khorasan Province
Soltanabad, Razavi Khorasan, a city in Khoshab County
Soltanabad, former name of Kashmar, Iran
Soltanabad, Bardaskan, a village in Bardaskan County
Soltanabad, Chenaran, a village in Chenaran County
Soltanabad, Kalat, a village in Kalat County
Soltanabad, Khvaf, a village in Khvaf County
Soltanabad, Mahvelat, a village in Mahvelat County
Soltanabad, Mashhad, a village in Mashhad County
Soltanabad-e Namak, a village in Mashhad County
Soltanabad, Nishapur, a village in Nishapur County
Soltanabad, Torbat-e Heydarieh, a village in Torbat-e Heydarieh County
Soltanabad Rural District (Razavi Khorasan Province), in Khoshab County

South Khorasan Province
Soltanabad, Nehbandan

West Azerbaijan Province
Soltanabad, Urmia, a village in Urmia County
Soltanabad, Anzal, a village in Urmia County

Yazd Province
Soltanabad, Yazd, a village in Taft County
Soltanabad, Pishkuh, a village in Taft County

Zanjan Province
Soltanabad, Zanjan, a village in Zanjan County

See also
Sultanabad (disambiguation)

ca:Soltanabad